Cwm Taf Fechan Woodlands is a Site of Special Scientific Interest on the northern outskirts of Merthyr Tydfil, in south Wales. It has semi-natural broadleaved woodland, with a variety of plants, some of which are rare. The  site under protection is dominated by oak, ash, downy birch, and hazel and hawthorn. The Taf Fechan river flows nearby.

See also
List of Sites of Special Scientific Interest in Mid & South Glamorgan

References

Sites of Special Scientific Interest in Merthyr Tydfil County Borough